Eosentomon megaglenum is a species of proturan in the family Eosentomidae. It is found in Southern Asia.

References

Eosentomon
Articles created by Qbugbot
Animals described in 1990